Chandon was a former commune in the canton of Fribourg in Switzerland. On January 1, 1994, it merged with Léchelles to form Léchelles.

Chandon
Former municipalities of Switzerland